"Nineteen Hundred and Eighty-Five" (sometimes written as "1985") is a song by the British–American rock band Paul McCartney and Wings, released as the final track on their 1973 album Band on the Run. It has been featured on the 2001 documentary DVD Wingspan and Paul McCartney and Wings' 1974 TV special One Hand Clapping. A 2016 remix of the song was nominated for a Grammy Award.  The song was referenced in Brett Easton Ellis’s novel Glamorama, driving a group of fictional supermodels to extreme terrorist acts.

Lyrics and music
Paul McCartney has said that the song originated with just the first line.

The tune is the climactic track from the album Band on the Run. It continues the album's theme of escape by describing the singer achieving artistic freedom through love. Author Andrew Grant Jackson calls the lyrics "gibberish" and mere placeholders for the excitement and "cinematic purpose" of the music."

The song has a grandiose ending with a full orchestra and the band. Other instrumentation includes mellotron, organ and horns. The album version ends with an excerpt of the opening song's chorus. This song is featured on several episodes of Trigger Happy TV. In its early life, it was simply titled "Piano Thing".

Ultimate Classic Rock critic Dave Swanson rated the song as McCartney's 8th most underrated song, saying that "A funky groove holds the song together as Paul delivers a gritty bluesy vocal."

Personnel
 Paul McCartney – lead vocals, guitar, bass guitar, piano, keyboards, drums
 Linda McCartney – backing vocals, keyboards
 Denny Laine – vocals, guitar
 Tony Visconti – orchestrations
 Beaux Arts Orchestra – horns, strings
Personnel per The Beatles Bible.

Live performances
"Nineteen Hundred and Eighty-Five" was never performed live by Wings. McCartney performed the song live for the first time ever during his 2010–2011 Up and Coming Tour. He played the song live again during his 2011–2012 On the Run Tour, his 2013–2015 Out There Tour, his 2016–2017 One on One Tour, his performance on 26 July 2018 in the Liverpool Cavern Club, his 2018–2019 Freshen Up tour, at 12-12-12: The Concert for Sandy Relief and on his 2022 Got Back tour. On 25 June 2022, a week after his 80th birthday, he performed the song as part of his Saturday night headline act, on the Pyramid stage, at the Glastonbury Festival.

Cover versions
The Golden Dogs included a cover version on their 2006 album Big Eye Little Eye.

In 2016, German producer Timo Maas and Canadian DJ James Teej released a remix of the track with McCartney's approval. Their version received a Grammy nomination for Best Remixed Recording, Non-Classical at the 59th Annual Grammy Awards.

Tracklisting
Download single
"Nineteen Hundred and Eighty-Five" (Radio Edit) – 2:46
"Nineteen Hundred and Eighty-Five" – 6:01
"Nineteen Hundred and Eighty-Five" (Club Mix) – 5:07

Remix download single
"Nineteen Hundred and Eighty-Five" (Kerri Chandler Kaoz 623 Again Vocal Mix) – 7:25
"Nineteen Hundred and Eighty-Five" (Paul Woodford Rework) – 10:03
"Nineteen Hundred and Eighty-Five" (Tim Green Remix) – 8:49

References

1973 songs
1974 singles
Paul McCartney songs
Paul McCartney and Wings songs
Songs written by Paul McCartney
Songs written by Linda McCartney
Song recordings produced by Paul McCartney
Music published by MPL Music Publishing
Apple Records singles